James Wilson (January 28, 1920 – May 2, 1997), nicknamed "Nip", was an American Negro league outfielder in the 1940s.

A native of Newberry, South Carolina, Wilson made his Negro leagues debut in 1940 with the Indianapolis Crawfords and Birmingham Black Barons. He played for Birmingham again in 1941, his final professional season. Wilson died in Woonsocket, Rhode Island in 1997 at age 77.

References

External links
 and Seamheads

1920 births
1997 deaths
Birmingham Black Barons players
Baseball outfielders
Baseball players from South Carolina
People from Newberry, South Carolina
20th-century African-American sportspeople